Kankavli is a city in Sindhudurg district in the Indian state of Maharashtra. It is an important city due to its central location in the Sindhudurg district. All talukas are at an equal distance from Kankavli city. There is a temple of Shri Bhalchandra Maharaj and Swyambhu Ravalnath. The Kankavli city is situated in between two west flowing rivers which carry roaring gushing waters on their rockbed to Arabian sea in monsoon. It is a culturally, educationally and socially rich and vibrant major city. A veteran Gandhian Shri Appasaheb Patwardhan founded Gopuri Ashram near Kankavli city with principles of Swadeshi, Swatchhata, Swawlamban and Sarvodaya in 1948. Kankavli is equally located from Kolhapur and Ratnagiri. This is one of the important railway stations on Konkan railway route and major towns on NH 66. Cabinet Minister Shri. Narayan Rane also hails from this area.

Etymology
The name Kankavli is derived from Sanskrit name 'Kanakavalli' (Devanagari: कनकवल्लि) which means golden land. (Kanaka: Gold; Valli: Land).

Location and weather
Kankavli is located in south-west Maharashtra. It has an elevation of 42 metres. Kankavli is situated on the banks of two Rivers, the Gad River and the Janavli River. It is surrounded by villages like Kirlos, Natal, Nagawe, Bidwadi, Kalmath, and Halval. It is an important railway station on the Konkan Railway route as major trains stop here. Kankavli city is 441 km from Mumbai along the NH 66 and 125.1 km from Ratnagiri.

Kankavli's climate is a blend of coastal and inland climate of Maharashtra. The temperature has a relatively narrow range between 20 °C to 40 °C. Weather in Kankavli from October to May is humid. Maximum temperatures rarely exceed 40 °C and typically range between 33 and 35 °C. Lows during this season are around 20 °C to 26 °C. The city receives abundant rainfall from June to September due to its proximity to the Western Ghats and Arabian Sea. Temperatures are low in the rainy season and range between 19 °C to 30 °C. The winter temperatures are a bit higher compared to other towns. Lows range from 12 °C to 18 °C while highs are in the range of 26 °C to 32 °C. Humidity is low in this season making weather much more pleasant. Flooding is not a problem as Kankavli lies on a higher altitude than the sea level.

Nearby villages
Villages in Kankavli taluka include:

Natal Village  is situated 16 km from Kankavali railway station. 460 km from State capital Mumbai. It is situated below the sahyadri mountain, has a very popular Shree Rameshwar Devalaya of lord Shiva. The temple has a great historical and aesthetic value. Mauli devi devalay is the holy place which is located at the below of the Mountain with good nature surrounding. Harinam Saptah is celebrated every year with great devotion in Rameshwar Temple. Hanuman Mandir at Pangamawadi also located in natal Hanuman jayanti utsav has been celebrated every year. Dahikala utsav is also celebrated at 'Chavata' Place which is at the center place of the village. Ganesh festival is the most celebrating festival in natal & nearest Villages. In monsoon season many big waterfalls reappear on mountain region of village. During July to November green nature is surrounded throughout whole village. Rice is the main crop taken by the local villager. In April to June (vacation season), it is famous for "Rayval" mangoes, hapus mangoes, cashew nuts, Carissa carandas (karwand), jack fruits and "Jambul"(Jamun fruit). Natal village has High School & College for good education.Students also come from near by villages like digawale, nardave, dariste & more. Village has multi specialty Super hospital(Sai leela Hospital) for good health of local villager.there are various Wadis like Rajwadi, Mahul wadi, Tambe wadi, Anand wadi, Kumbhar wadi, goankar wadi, pangamwadi, khandarwadi, sutar wadi, kawaletembwadi, mogarnewadi, bedamwadi, jadhavwadi,etc. which forms together Natal village.climate is very ideal to healthy stay, very calm surrounding for better life. So please visit at least one time to Natal village in life.
Tarandale is located 23 km towards North from District headquarters Oros. 4 km from Kankavali. 447 km from State capital Mumbai. Tevnai devi is gram devata of this village. Dev Diwali is celebrated every year with great devotion.
Tarandale Pin code is 416602 and postal head office is Kankavli.
Kasarde village is the large village in Kankavali Tehsil. Kasarde is located 20 km from Kankavli. There are Various Wadis Like Sarwankarwadi,Nagsawantwadi,Bramhanwadi,Pawaskarwadi, parkarwadi,Satamwadi,Dhumalwadi, Aayrewadi, Deulkarwadi, Tambalwadi, Tarfewadi, Bandwadi, Aanand Nagar, Uttar Gavthan, Dakshin Gavthan, Dabwadi, Boudhwadi, Jambhulwadi, NakasheWadi and Kasarde Titha.
  Halwal village  is situated 5 km away from Kankavali railway station.It is famous for "Rayval" mangoes (a variety of mangoes which are less sweeter than popular "Hapus" or "Alphanso" mangoes) and "Jambul"(Jamun fruit).  Due to its proximity with the main city, most of the people travel to city most frequently.
 Varawade village - Narayan Tatu Rane (Ex C.M. Maharashtra state) happens to be from Varawade village which incidentally is in this taluka.
 Sangave village have a very popular Shree Rameshwar Mandir. The temple has a great historical and aesthetic value. It is a Swayambhu Devasthan. Dahikala and Saptah is celebrated every year in Rameshwar Temple. And most popular river name was Gad Nadi, continuous running throughout the year.
 Kumbhavade village is situated 18 km away from kankavli. They have a very popular Shree Mahalingeshwar Mandir. The temple has a great historical and aesthetic value. It is a Swayambhu Devasthan. Mahashivratri Jatra is held every year. The jatra is held for people to seek the blessings of their Kuldaivat Shri Mahalingeshwar God.
 Nardave Village is 30 km away to the east of Kankavli. This place is in the Sahyadri Range Mountain from Nardave Gargoti, District Kolhapur is just 15–20 km away by mountain roads. Mata Ambadevi is gram devata of this village. Beautiful Temple of Ambadevi, Vithala Devi, Ravalnath, Bramhandev are in this village. Bhairav Gad is situated at North-East direction of this village. Navratra, Dahikala, Harinam Saptah is celebrated every year with great devotion. At the end of village, Nardave dam is being constructed which is one of the biggest dam in locality.
 Kalmath Village is just 1.5 km away from Kankavli. This place is known for their Kalam mango, Hapus mango, cashew nuts and karvande(a local fruit). Kalmath is also known for its Masjid (mosque) built in 1960, one of the first built in this region. Built on a grand scale, it has an important historical value. The village including 84 villages ranging to Achra were ruled by Nadkarni ancestry under the Peshwas and later on their own under British government after the fall of the Peshwas as the Khots of the region up to 1949, when the Khoti abolishment act was enacted. The history of the above is widely mentioned in “Peshwanchi Bakhar“ the autobiography book of the Peshwas.
 Nandgaon is just 12.5 km away from Kankavli. A small town on the national highway NH 17 it is a road junction the southbound road goes to Goa the northbound road goes to Mumbai the westbound road goes to Devgad the eastbound road goes to Phondaghat (Kolhapur/Nippani); the southbound one wadi is Patilwadi their well known Dattmandir his founder Dattram Patil and there is one wadi is vashinawadi there well known shubham santosh morye . in nandgoan every year kolamba jatra is celebrated here . in nandgoan, jatra's two time celebrate one time celebrated patil (patlanchi jatra) and second time celebrate morye (moryanvhi jatra) . in nandgoan titaa, there is one famous person is telar morye (govind hari morye) .and constructor pandu morye (pandurang hari morye). there are many beautiful places to visit in kankavli. 
 Harkul (Khurd)  is just 18 km from Kankavli a small village near phondaghat. The village is surrounded by sahyadri hill and there are various Wadi like Mahul wadi, Tembi wadi, Dongare wadi, Kumbhar wadi etc.  which forms harkul khurd village. Shingoba is the holy place which is located at the top of the Mountain. Generally, people of Harkul village come to Phonda market for their daily requirements. Harkul village is located just 6 km from Phonda ST Bus Depot. Mata Pavana devi is gram devata of this village.Harinam Saptah is celebrated every year with great devotion.
 Tiware  is 13 km (approx.) back from Kankavli at Mumbai Goa highway. Phonda market and Kankavli market are nearby markets from Tiware.
 Osargaon  is a village 8 km between kankavli and kasal ST BUS DEPOT, being connected directly to NH17 which is now known as NH 66, tourist spots available as osargoan talaw(dam) and Lingmauli mandir(temple) which is just 1 km. from dam, surrounding with natural environment, devotees come here to full fill there satisfaction to this temple, it is just 1½ km from NH17, most of the land is popular for red bricks (stone) mining, people here are depended mostly on Agriculture like producing cashew, alphoso mango, coconut, rice as well as nowadays new generation doing all different types of daily wages, jobs, shops, hotels, business as there occupation. "Ganesh chachurthi " is the actual festival to enjoy 10/12 days through heart from all konkan konkanis is to welcome lord "Ganesha " which is celebrated in September, & later all go back who comes to there native place anyhow to get blessings from God Ganesha. and much more to say, thankyou...
 Digwale  Digavle village is in Digavle taluka of Sindhudurg district in state of Maharashtra. Digavle village Distance from district place Sindhudurg is about 48 km. Digavle village distance from Taluka place Kankavli is about 22 km. Digavle village area is 1275.00 hector. According to 2011 census population of Digavle village is 1,317. About 387 families lives in Digavle village. Total male population is 630 and female population is 687. Digavle village has a sub post office. Pincode of village Digavle is 416609. Public state transport services are available in village Digavle. Digavle does not have railway station Digivle is not the national highway. Digivle is not the state highway Digivle is on the road Digvle does not have commercial / nationalise banks Digavle does not have co-operative banks Digivle has agriculture credit societies Digivle does not have agricultural credit societies Digavle has self help groups Digivle does not have daily market Digvle does not have weekly market Digvle does not have public library Digavle has newspaper services 
Digvale is a middle class village in Sindhudurg district of Kanakwali taluka, and there are 387 families. Digvale has a population of 1317, of which 630 are males and 687 are females as per census population.

 Harkul Budruk is situated 5 km away from Kankavali railway station.There is one Engineering College named Sindhudurg Shikshan Prasarak Mandal's College of Engineering, Kankavali. One High school L.G.Samant Vidyalay. there was two famous droctor name Dr. Marathe and Dr. Rajahmad Patel. In this village onside big river "Gadnadi". As per area this village is the biggest village in Sindhudurg district.

Demographics
 India census, Kankavli had a population of 16,398. Males constitute 52% of the population and females 48%. Kankavli is the third biggest city in Sindhudurg District after Sawantwadi and Malvan. Kankavli has an average literacy rate of 77%, higher than the national average of 59.5%: male literacy is 79%, and female literacy is 74%. In Kankavli, 12% of the population is under 6 years of age.

Climate

Politics
Kankavli city is centrally located from Kolhapur and Ratnagiri.
Kankavli has recently come into the limelight as a result of politics. It is a Vidhansabha constituency of former Chief Minister of Maharashtra Mr.Narayan Rane and had witnessed many political disputes between political party members due to dynamic changes in the state's politics in recent times. Kankavli has its own Nagarpanchayat (Municipal Council) (local authority), a Panchayat Samitee office, Tehsildar Office, Taluka Court, and other administrative offices. Mr. Vinayak Raut is the MP(ShivSena) from the Ratnagiri - Sindhudurg Loksabha Constituency. Mr.Nitesh Narayan Rane is the MLA (BJP) from the Kankavli-Devgad Vidhansabha Constituency.

Tourist Places in Kankavli
 Shree Jain Brahman Rameshwar Temple, Kirlos
 Bhalchandra Maharaj Kankavli
 Sahyadrivasi campground kankavli
 Savdav Waterfall Kankavli
 Harkul Khurd Talav Kankavli
 Kumbhavde Waterfall kankavli
 Kurli Dam Kankavli
 Ozaram Talav Kankavli
 Osargaon Talav Kankavli
Bhairavgad, Digavale,Kankavli

References

Cities and towns in Sindhudurg district
Talukas in Maharashtra